The nail knot, also known as the tube knot or gryp knot, is mostly used in carp and fly-fishing. The nail knot was named because a nail was inserted as a guide when threading the line. Today, it is easier to use a small straw. The nail knot is an important fishing knot used to join two lines of different diameters and allows for line diameters to diminish down to the fly. I.E., it is useful for attaching your backing to the fly line, and your fly line to the leader, or tippet. The knot can be tied in multiple ways and is uniform.
 
Most common uses in fly-fishing are attaching the leader to the fly line and attaching the fly line to the backing.  Fly-fishing is an angling method in which an artificial "fly" is used to catch fish. The fly is cast using a fly rod, reel, and specialized weighted line. Casting a nearly weightless fly or "lure" requires casting techniques significantly different from other forms of casting. Fly fishermen use hand-tied flies that resemble natural invertebrates or other food organisms, or "lures" to provoke the fish to strike. Carp anglers use the nail knot to attach monofilament-fishing line and/or braided fishing line to lead core leader material. 

To tie the nail knot by hand is very difficult; therefore some anglers use a nail knot-tying tool. It is one of those deceptively simple, clever, useful, and easy to use tools that many seem to own. This tool also seems to fly "under the radar" in terms of public awareness. It allows fishermen to tie any size monofilament, fluorocarbon line or fishing braid to any size fishhook, fishing lure or lead core in just seconds. With it you can tie various knots, but it is best known for the nail/gryp knot. It can't come untied because the untied end is gripped by all the turns of the knot. This knot will not slip, even if you make a hair loop on a carp hair rig, as the tag end goes under all the wraps.  

How To Tie the Nail Knot

 Lay a nail or hollow tube against the end of a fly line. Set the butt section end of a leader against the line and tube. Leave an extra 10–12″ of its tag end to tie the knot.
 Make 6–8 close together wraps, working left to right, back around the leader, line and tube or nail. Pass the tag end through the tube or the spaces made by the nail and remove the tube.
 Pull tag end to snug up the coils, then tag end and leader to seat the knot firmly onto the fly line.
 Trim tag end close to the knot.

See also
List of bend knots
List of knots

References

Fishing knots